Dragoljub Milošević (8 November 1929 – 2 October 2005) was a Serbian footballer and football manager.

He played for VSK, OFK Napred, Budućnost Valjevo, Jedinstvo Zemun, Red Star Belgrade, Mačva Šabac and Metalac Valjevo.

He coached Budućnost Valjevo, Metalac Valjevo, Radnički Niš, Sloboda Titovo Užice, Vojvodina, Čelik Zenica, Valencia CF, Olimpija Ljubljana, Budućnost Titograd, Napredak Kruševac, Cádiz CF and CD Tenerife.

References

1929 births
2005 deaths
Sportspeople from Valjevo
Association footballers not categorized by position
Serbian footballers
Yugoslav footballers
FK Budućnost Valjevo players
FK Zemun players
Red Star Belgrade footballers
FK Mačva Šabac players
Yugoslav First League players
Serbian football managers
Serbian expatriate football managers
Yugoslav football managers
FK Radnički Niš managers
FK Vojvodina managers
NK Čelik Zenica managers
Valencia CF managers
NK Olimpija Ljubljana (1945–2005) managers
FK Budućnost Podgorica managers
Cádiz CF managers
CD Tenerife managers
FK Sutjeska Nikšić managers